Falling in love is the development of strong feelings of attachment and love, usually towards another person.
  
The term is metaphorical, emphasizing that the process, like the physical act of falling, is sudden, uncontrollable and leaves the lover in a vulnerable state, similar to "fall ill" or "fall into a trap".

It may also reflect the importance of the lower brain centers in the process, which can lead the rational, accounting brain to conclude (in John Cleese's words) that "this falling in love routine is very bizarre.... It borders on the occult".

Factors

Mental
"Factors known to contribute strongly to falling in love include proximity, similarity, reciprocity, and physical attractiveness", while at the same time, the process involves a re-activation of old childhood patterns of attachment. Deep-set psychological parallels between two people may also underpin their pairing-bonding, which can thus border on mere narcissistic identification.

Jungians view the process of falling in love as one of projecting the anima or animus onto the other person, with all the potential for misunderstanding that this can involve.

Chemical

Two chemical reactions associated with falling in love are increases in oxytocin and vasopressin; and Elisabeth Young-Bruehl has suggested that "when we fall in love we are falling into a stream of naturally occurring amphetamines running through the emotional centres of our very own brains". With regard to sociobiology, it is stressed that mate selection cannot be left to the head alone and must require complex neurochemical support.

Critics of such Neo-Darwinism point out that over-simplistic physical arguments obscure the way sexual passion often leads not to secure attachment but to attachments thwarted, as well as the sheer frightening difficulties of all falling in love.

Biologist Jeremy Griffith suggests that people fall in love in order to abandon themselves to the dream of an ideal state (being one free of the human condition).

"Sexual desire and love not only show differences but also recruit a striking common set of brain areas that mediate somatosensory integration, reward expectation, and social cognition" Neuroimaging studies show that love and sexual desire share common chemical reactions in the brain. Both love and lust show neural activation in regions such as the cortical area (e.g., middle gyrus, superior temporal gyrus, temporo-parietal junction, and occipital-temporal cortices) and the subcortical brain areas (e.g., striatum, thalamus, hippocampus, anterior cingulate cortex, and ventral segmental area). The cortical area of the brain is correlated with a person's self-representation, goals-directed actions, and body image. Neuroimaging can also show the difference between love and desire. Some brain regions that contribute to either love or lust are the anterior insula, posterior insula, and the ventral striatum. The anterior insula activates factors that contribute to love such as integrative representations, whereas the posterior insula is involved with factors that contribute to desire such as current sensations, feelings, and responses. The ventral striatum however, becomes activated during pleasurable rewarding experiences such as sex or food.

Gender differences 
Many studies indicate a positive linear correlation between romantic popularity and physical attractiveness for women more than men. Some studies indicate that men subconsciously seek slenderness and sexiness whereas women seek status, permanence, and affluence before they seek physical attractiveness. In addition, men tend to show their emotions through actions while women tend to express their feelings with words.

Timing
Stendhal charted the timing of falling in love in terms of what he called crystallization—a first period of crystallization (of some six weeks) which often involves obsessive brooding and the idealisation of the other via a coating of desire; a period of doubt; and then a final crystallization of love.

Empirical studies suggest that men fall in love earlier than women and women are quicker to fall out of love than men.

Studies show When comparing men who have fallen in love, their testosterone level is much higher than those that have been in a long-lasting relationship.

See also

References

Further reading
Robert J Sternberg and Karen Sternberg, editors. The New Psychology of Love. Yale University Press, 2008.
Denis de Rougemont, Love in the Western World. Pantheon Books, 1956.
Eric Fromm, The Art of Loving (1956)
Francesco Alberoni, Falling in Love (New York, Random House, 1983)
Roland Barthes, A Lover's Discourse (1990)

External links

Love
Romance